Zolotovka is the name of several rural localities in Russia:
Zolotovka, Ivanovo Oblast, a village in Vichugsky District of Ivanovo Oblast
Zolotovka, Kurgan Oblast, a village in Novogeorgiyevsky Selsoviet of Petukhovsky District in Kurgan Oblast; 
Zolotovka, Saratov Oblast, a selo in Marksovsky District of Saratov Oblast
Zolotovka, Tambov Oblast, a selo in Zolotovsky Selsoviet of Rzhaksinsky District in Tambov Oblast